All the Time in the World is a Canadian documentary film, directed by Suzanne Crocker and released in 2014. The film documents the decision of Crocker and her family to spend nine months away from their home in Dawson City, Yukon to live off the grid in a wilderness setting entirely without modern technological conveniences such as electricity or indoor plumbing.

The film premiered at the 2014 Vancouver International Film Festival, where it won the award for Most Popular Canadian Documentary. It was screened at the Available Light Film Festival in Whitehorse, Yukon, in 2015, where it won the Audience Award for Best Canadian Documentary.

References

External links

All the Time in the World at Library and Archives Canada

2014 films
2014 documentary films
Canadian documentary films
Films shot in Yukon
2010s English-language films
2010s Canadian films